The Saint Vincent and the Grenadines National Cycling Championships are held annually, and cover both the individual time trial and road race disciplines.

Road Race

Men

Women

Time Trial

Men

Women

See also
National road cycling championships

References

National Time Trial Championships
National road cycling championships
Cycling